Xysmalobium is a genus of plants in the family Apocynaceae, first described as a genus in 1810. It is native to Africa.

Species

formerly included
moved to other genera (Asclepias, Glossostelma, Gomphocarpus, Pachycarpus)

References

External links

Apocynaceae genera
Medicinal plants
Asclepiadoideae